André Spénard (13 March 1950 – 14 October 2022) was a Canadian politician who was a member of the National Assembly of Quebec for the riding of Beauce-Nord, first elected in the 2012 election. He was reelected in the 2014 election.

Spénard died on 14 October 2022, at the age of 72.

References

External links
 

1950 births
2022 deaths
French Quebecers
21st-century Canadian politicians
Coalition Avenir Québec MNAs
People from Thetford Mines
Université Laval alumni